Court Fields School is located in Wellington, Somerset, England. Court Fields is home to the “Theatre Of Leaves”, which is known to be one of the most atmospheric football grounds in the United Kingdom. The school teaches 753 pupils from 11 to 16, and does not contain a sixth form.

History
Since 2005, major developments have occurred. A new block was built for the teaching of Humanities and a sports complex has been constructed in place of the old tennis courts.

In January 2013, the school was placed into special measures by Ofsted, following an inspection in November 2012 that rated the school as inadequate on a four-point scale of outstanding, good, satisfactory and inadequate. In 2016 it was rated as requiring improvement.

The school became a Sponsored Academy from January 2014 in partnership with the Castle School, Taunton.

Notable former pupils
At the 2016 Summer Olympics a former pupil Edward Ling won a bronze medal in Trap shooting. Another former pupil Tom Nichols is a professional footballer who plays as a striker for Bristol Rovers in League One. Another former pupil is Paul Williams the Bishop of Southwell and Nottingham.

References

External links 
 

Secondary schools in Somerset
Academies in Somerset
Wellington, Somerset